Kyiv Capital Racing was a UCI Continental team founded in 2015 and based in Ukraine. It took participation in UCI Continental Circuits races.

Team roster
As of 1 July 2015.

Major results
2015
Grand Prix of ISD, Andriy Khripta

References

UCI Continental Teams (Europe)
Defunct cycling teams based in Ukraine
Cycling teams established in 2015
Cycling teams disestablished in 2015
2015 establishments in Ukraine
2015 disestablishments in Ukraine